Saint George's Tower is a small watchtower in St. Julian's, Malta. It was built in 1638 and is one of the Lascaris towers. Today, it is located in the grounds of a hotel.

History 

Saint George's Tower is located at St. George's Bay, St. Julian's. Its site was originally occupied by a medieval watch post. It appears in maps of the period of the Knights at Cala S. Giorgio (St Georeg’s Point).
The tower remained in use during the British period but was converted to a Fire Control Station once Fort Pembroke was built. The tower served as a radio communications post in World War II. The tower appears in a 1916 painting with the British additions.

It was listed by MEPA as a Grade I National Monument in 1995, and in 1997 the fire control tower added by the British was demolished, which restored the tower to its original state.

The tower is now incorporated within the grounds of the Corinthia Hotel St George's Bay.

See also
Lascaris towers
List of monuments in St. Julian's

References

External links
National Inventory of the Cultural Property of the Maltese Islands

Lascaris towers
Towers completed in 1638
St. Julian's, Malta
National Inventory of the Cultural Property of the Maltese Islands
1638 establishments in Malta